José Alfredo Aguirre Infante (born 4 January 1994) is a Mexican track and road cyclist, who currently rides for UCI Continental team . He competed in the madison and omnium events at the 2014 UCI Track Cycling World Championships.

References

External links

1994 births
Living people
Mexican track cyclists
Mexican male cyclists
Cyclists at the 2015 Pan American Games
Cyclists at the 2019 Pan American Games
Pan American Games competitors for Mexico
21st-century Mexican people
Competitors at the 2018 Central American and Caribbean Games